Naceur Damergi, known as the Slaughterer of Nabeul, born in 1944 in Tunis during the French colonization in Tunisia and died on 17 November 1990. He was a serial killer who carried out his crimes in the 1980s.

Executed by hanging for the kidnapping, rape and murder of fourteen minors in Nabeul, Tunisia. According to his testimony to the police in 1990, he was an outcast throughout his life, which generated resentment against some members of his area. Damergi's request for clemency was denied by president Zine el-Abidine Ben Ali. He was the last person against whom capital punishment was carried out in Tunisia.

Biography

Background 
He was the illegitimate son of a prostitute called Houria. In 1943, she met a young man from the Zaghouan countryside and became pregnant with him. Her relationship with him caused her to be imprisoned while she was pregnant, and she gave birth to her son at Charles Nicole Hospital in Tunis. After leaving prison, she married a farmer and registered her son in his name. Naceur Damergi did not know his biological father until thirty years later. Everyone who knew him described him as unattractive and of short stature, and that his physical build did not indicate that he was capable of committing the murders he is guilty of.

He was also fluent in the French language and described as intelligent according to the testimony of the doctors and psychiatrists who treated him. During his childhood he studied at the Bourguiba Children's School and then interrupted his education to work in agriculture. He traveled to France in 1964 after he got engaged to his cousin whom he loved and returned in 1968 to find that his fiancée had married another man, and this fueled his anger. 20 years later, he killed his ex-fiancée's son in 1988. Naceur Damergi was working in the field of agriculture and renting farms, he was in a good financial condition.

Crimes 
The first crime committed by Naceur Damergi was against a child named Muhammad Ali who was put by chance on Naceur road on 15 June 1987 around midday. He caught sight of him on the side of the road indicating to him to stand, and he stopped and took him with him on his red motorcycle, but he offered to go with him to his farm to help him reap almond fruits in return for a fee. The child welcomed the idea and accompanied him to the place. There he climbed one of the almond trees. Naceur did not intend to kill him, had he not seen him half naked while he was on the tree. He could not control himself and wanted to infringe upon him, so he offered him to participate in eating and then expressed his intention to rape him and then tempted him with money, but the young man refused and tried to escape. Here Naceur caught up with him and put one hand over his mouth to prevent him from screaming and pressed his other hand on his neck until he died. He thought he had fainted and put him to bed. He tried to wake him up until 6 hours had passed. He despaired of his survival and took him to bury him in his farm. From here, he discovered a great way to kill.

After committing his first crime, he was afraid of being discovered and refrained from committing another crime, but this abstention did not last long, so he quickly committed a crime within a year, in February 1988. The immorality of the 18-year-old man, the oldest victim of incest, was the penalty for his refusal to die by suffocation and his immorality of his dead. Al-Nasir got used to killing and knew that strangulation was a good, easy and effective method, and he was good at hiding bodies.

He started using his skills in killing, crimes continued, and the number of child victims rose, and he seemed to take murder as a way to settle his old accounts. He immediately remembered his ex-fiancée who had betrayed him while he was in France to marry someone else. He tried to lure her with money to divorce her husband and return to him, but she refused. He searched for a long way to take revenge on her. And he found her weak point, that he is her only son who loves him so much, he wanted to deprive her of him just as she deprived him of her love. Ramzi is 13 years old. Nasser followed him and knew all his movements, but he decided to leave it to chance and coincidence wanted to put Ramzi in front of Nasser on 26 January 1988.

As usual, he found a scenario to lure him and took him with him to a valley with a farm and an abandoned house, there he had his bitter memories with his mother, so he did disgusting things to him, he assaulted him with obscenity and a sharp instrument, Ramzi was the only victim who was brutally assaulted by the thug, this was the main crime of the thug, was Her goal is to avenge a failed love story, after which his crimes continued until the number of victims of children reached 14 children, ranging in age from 10 to 18 years.

Arrest 
Before the arrest of Naceur Damergi, many suspects were arrested, including Naceur himself, and he was released for lack of argument, but he was arrested again on 27 November 1989 and this time he fled and during his escape he committed other crimes and the second time was the last in which Naceur Damergi confessed to his shocking crimes general opinion. Lawyers in Tunisia refused to defend him, so the court assigned a lawyer to defend him, the lawyer of Naceur Damergi, who says that in his meeting with him, the thug said that he had seizures in which he felt heat sweeping his body and committed his crimes without batting an eyelid.

From the perspective of psychology, "Naceur Damergi is a sexual criminal whose crimes fall within the framework of personality disorders that are characterized by a lack of adaptation to society. This psychological state does not absolve the serial killer from legal responsibility for the crimes he committed."

The psychiatrist who started his case says that he is a possessive person, socially and mentally ill, suffering from pedophilia and some personality disorders. Jokes from time to time.

Legacy 
On 5 March 2013, after the Tunisian Revolution, the full details of the case were presented in the TV show Roufiat El Jalsa, which is broadcast on El Hiwar El Tounsi channel, in two episodes, in which some of the victims’ families, forensic doctors, psychologists, lawyers for the perpetrator and eyewitnesses were shown. However, the perpetrator's lawyer stated in the program that his agent had been in a traffic accident that caused a concussion of 30%, and that he had severe mental disorders and was in a state of permanent isolation.

Leaders magazine in 2013 
Hassan, who carried out the death sentence against the butcher, said in a press interview with Leaders magazine that the murderer was executed at three o’clock in the morning, and usually the execution process does not last more than 4 or 5 minutes until the soul leaves the body, but the death of Naceur Damergi took 14 minutes With the number of his victims, it was as if God wanted to torture him every minute.When we opened the door to his cell and got three of us on top of him to put our hands behind his back and handcuff him, Naceur Damergi, Nabeul's serial killer, was taken in surprise. But, quickly, he realized what had to happen to him. As he lifted him his legs were floating and kept repeating, God forgive me. We take it to the judge's office. He was seated behind his desk accompanied by two other magistrates and a municipal registrar. An imam and a doctor were on standby, as were the prison director, the director general of prison services and a team dispatched from the hospital to collect the remains.

References

See also 

 List of serial killers by country
 List of serial killers by number of victims

1944 births
1990 deaths
Executed Tunisian serial killers
Male serial killers
Tunisian murderers of children
People executed by Tunisia by hanging
People from Tunis